Halaq ash Shuqayq  is a town in the Madaba Governorate of north-western Jordan.

References

Populated places in Madaba Governorate